In baseball and softball, second baseman, abbreviated 2B, is a fielding position in the infield, between second and first base. The second baseman often possesses quick hands and feet, needs the ability to get rid of the ball quickly, and must be able to make the pivot on a double play.   In addition, second basemen are usually right-handed; only four left-handed throwing players have ever played second base in Major League Baseball since 1950. In the numbering system used to record defensive plays, the second baseman is assigned the number 4.

Good second basemen need to have very good range since they have to field balls closer to the first baseman who is often holding runners on, or moving towards the base to cover. On a batted ball to right field, the second baseman goes out towards the ball for the relay. Due to these requirements, second base is sometimes a primarily defensive position in the modern game, but there are hitting stars as well.

Functions

The second baseman catches line drives or pop flies hit near him, and fields ground balls hit near him and then throws the ball to a base to force out a runner. In this case, if the runner is to be forced out at second base then that base is covered by the shortstop.

With a runner on first base, on a ground ball to the shortstop or third baseman the second baseman will cover second base to force out the runner coming from first. Moreover, if there are fewer than two outs he will attempt to turn the double play: that is, he will receive the throw from the other player with his foot on second base (to force out the runner coming from first base), and in one motion pivot toward first base and throw the ball there (to force out the batter before he gets there).

If a runner on first base attempts to steal second base, or if the pitcher attempts to pick off a runner already at second base, then either the second baseman or the shortstop will cover second base.

National Baseball Hall of Fame second basemen

The following second basemen have been elected to the National Baseball Hall of Fame and Museum:

 Roberto Alomar
 Craig Biggio 
 Rod Carew 
 Eddie Collins
 Bobby Doerr
 Johnny Evers
 Nellie Fox
 Frankie Frisch
 Charlie Gehringer
 Joe Gordon
 Frank Grant
 Billy Herman
 Rogers Hornsby
 Nap Lajoie
 Tony Lazzeri
 Bill Mazeroski
 Bid McPhee
 Joe Morgan
 Paul Molitor 
 Jackie Robinson  
 Ryne Sandberg
 Red Schoendienst

Notes

Multiple Gold Glove Award winners

 Roberto Alomar: 10
 Ryne Sandberg: 9
 Bill Mazeroski: 8
 Frank White: 8
 Joe Morgan: 5
 Bobby Richardson: 5
 Craig Biggio: 4
 Bret Boone: 4
 Bobby Grich: 4
 Orlando Hudson: 4
 Dustin Pedroia: 4
 Brandon Phillips: 4
 Luis Castillo: 3
 Nellie Fox: 3
 Davey Johnson: 3
 Bobby Knoop: 3
 Harold Reynolds: 3
 Manny Trillo: 3
 Lou Whitaker: 3
 Robinson Canó: 2
 Tommy Helms: 2
 Felix Millan: 2
 Plácido Polanco: 2
 Pokey Reese: 2
 Fernando Vina: 2

Number of seasons with 100+ double plays turned at second base (among Hall of Fame second basemen)

 Bill Mazeroski: 11
 Nellie Fox: 10
 Bobby Doerr: 9
 Red Schoendienst: 8
 Charlie Gehringer: 7
 Joe Gordon: 7
 Billy Herman: 5
 Jackie Robinson: 4
 Roberto Alomar: 3
 Craig Biggio: 2
 Frankie Frisch: 2
 Rogers Hornsby: 2
 Joe Morgan: 2
 Ryne Sandberg: 2
 Tony Lazzeri: 1
 Bid McPhee: 1

Source: baseball-reference.com

References

Baseball positions